Ross M. Agius is a former Australian rules footballer who played for the Port Adelaide Football Club, an SANFL club, between 1979 and 1984. Born in Rosewater, an outer western suburb of Adelaide, Agius made 53 appearances for the club, including the winning grand final of 1980 against Norwood, where he assisted in three goals.

References

Australian rules footballers from South Australia
Indigenous Australian players of Australian rules football
Port Adelaide Football Club (SANFL) players
Port Adelaide Football Club players (all competitions)